Bhamdoun, is a town in Lebanon  from Beirut on the main road that leads to Damascus and in the suburbs of the main tourist city of Aley, lying at an altitude of  above the Lamartine valley. Two separate villages compose the town, Bhamdoun-el-mhatta (literally meaning "Bhamdoun the station") and Bhamdoun-el-day'aa ("Bhamdoun the village"). A railroad used to link Bhamdoun to Beirut with the train station being a prominent feature of the town for many years. The station and railroad were eventually abandoned when cars became more popular.

Before the Lebanese civil war, Bhamdoun was one of Lebanon's most renowned and favorite summer resorts.  Today, the town has regained some of its past tourism industry as most of its hotels, restaurants and entertainment centers have been renovated or rebuilt. Tourists, especially from Kuwait and the Persian Gulf region spend their summer vacation in Bhamdoun. Kuwaiti citizens own more than 30% of the properties in Bhamdoun Station since the 1950s. A branch of Kuwait airways and the National bank of kuwait reopened in 2001.

Bhamdoun has seven churches, two mosques built by Kuwaitis, and the Bhamdoun synagogue. There are four Greek Orthodox churches, two Maronite, one Protestant but was not reconstructed after the war, and Druze Khalwa. Most of the population is Orthodox Christian, but there also is a large Druze and Maronite minority with a smaller Sunni Muslim one.

The Bhamdoun synagogue, built in 1910, was one of three grand synagogues in Lebanon.  It was abandoned shortly before the civil war which started in 1975, but the shell of the structure still stands.

In 2000, a winery called Chateau Belle-Vue began planting vines, creating few jobs in the village. It began producing wine in 2003. The "Renaissance 2003" blend that it produced won the International Spirits and Wine Competition's Gold Medal Best in Class award in 2005. The town also contains the Safir Hotel, Four Points Hotel by Sheraton, Carlton Hotel, Alsheikh Hotel and many others.

Notable families
Families who have roots in Bhamdoun are:
Khairallah (also Cairala, Khairalla, Khiralla, Jairala, Kyrala, Kheirallah or Khayrallah)
Abdel Nour
Haddad (Also spelled Al Haddad)
Abou Rjeili (also spelled Bou Rjayle)
Abou Khaled 
Haber (also spelled El Haber, Habre, Habr)
Jabbour
Azo (also spelled Azzo)
Nehme
Matta
Moujaes (also spelled Majaess)
Salibi (also spelled Saliby or Al Salibi; see Kamal Salibi)
Abou Mansour
Sabra
Abou Faraj
Dannaf 
Raad
Ballout
Tabet
Moshreq
Asfar
Abou Hana
Wehbi
Nasrallah
Khalil Raad

References

Further reading

Populated places in Aley District
Eastern Orthodox Christian communities in Lebanon